Atari SA is a holding company formerly known as Infogrames Entertainment SA. This list contains titles released, published and distributed by Atari SA/Infogrames.

Infogrames

1996

1997

1999

2000

2001

2002

2003

Atari SA titles

2003

2004

2005

2006

2007

2008

2009

2010

2011

2012

2013

Microsoft Windows

Distribution only

References

Atari SA